John Chinaman was a stock caricature of a Chinese laborer seen in cartoons of the 19th century. Also referenced by Mark Twain and popular American songs of the period,  John Chinaman represented, in western society, a typical persona of China. He was typically depicted with a long queue and wearing a coolie hat.

American political cartoonist Thomas Nast, who often depicted John Chinaman, created a variant, John Confucius, to represent Chinese political figures. 
 
In Nast's cartoon "A Matter of Taste", published March 15, 1879 (seen at right), John Confucius expresses disapproval of Senator James G. Blaine for his support of the Chinese Exclusion Act. Blaine is shown dining in "Kearney's Senatorial Restaurant"—a reference to Denis Kearney, the leader of a violent anti-Chinese movement in California. John Confucius asks, "How can Christians stomach such diet?"

According to the Oxford English Dictionary, the term first emerged with British sailors who, uninterested in learning how to pronounce the names of the Chinese stewards, firemen, and sailors who worked as part of their crews, came up with the generic nickname of "John".

Notes

External links 
  Mark Twain on "John Chinaman"

Editorial cartooning
Race-related controversies
Cartoon controversies
Ethnic humour
Stereotypes of East Asian people
Stereotypes of Asian Americans
Chinaman
History of mass media in the United States
Asian-American issues
Chinese-American history